Air Sweden was an airline based in Stockholm, Sweden, which operated charter flights out of Stockholm-Arlanda Airport, and worldwide aircraft lease services. The company was founded as the successor of Nordic Airways and received its airline license in December 2009. The airline suspended all operation in September 2011.

Fleet

See also
 Airlines
 Transport in Sweden

References

External links

Defunct airlines of Sweden
Airlines established in 2009
Airlines disestablished in 2011
Defunct charter airlines